Out of the Dark (回魂夜; literal translation: "Night of Returning Soul") is a 1995 Hong Kong comedy horror film directed by Jeffrey Lau, starring Stephen Chow and Karen Mok.

Synopsis
Out of the Dark has earned a reputation as Stephen Chow's darkest film yet, adding brutal violence, gore, blood, and a wealth of black humour, including Chow's signature nonsense jokes.

The film is directed by Hong Kong director Jeffrey Lau. Chow plays Leo, a mental patient/ghostbuster who is a parody of the character Léon from the 1994 French film, The Professional, who talks to his plant for assistance, and co-starring Karen Mok as Kwan, a curious young girl who gets caught up with all the spooky situations. The pair are then joined by a brigade of quirky security guards in an attempt to get rid of the evil lurking in a supposedly haunted apartment building situated in Hong Kong.

Cast"Out of the Dark". IMDb. Retrieved 14 June 2016
 Stephen Chow as Leo
 Karen Mok as Kwan
 Bryan Leung as Mr. Wu
 Wong Yat-fei as Tit-dam, Security Guard
 Lee Lik-chi as a Security Guard
 Ben Wong as Keung
 Lee Kin-yan as Fat Cat
 Lam Suet as Eatery assistant
 Carol Tam as Mrs. Lee
 Lo Hung as Captain Lo
 Bruce Mang as Ming
 Chow Chi-fai as Mr. Lee
 Heung Dip as Beard/Chang
 Hau Woon-ling as Mr. Lee's dead mother
 Hui Si-man as Mrs. Cheung
 Wong Kam-tong as Kwan's father
 Bill Chan Wing-biu
 Wong Hei-yeung
 Jackson Ha Chak-san

References

External links

Out of the Dark at Hong Kong Cinemagic

Out of the Dark at LoveHKFilm.com

1995 films
1990s comedy horror films
Hong Kong comedy films
Hong Kong supernatural horror films
Hong Kong black comedy films
Hong Kong slapstick comedy films
Hong Kong ghost films
1990s ghost films
1990s Cantonese-language films
Films directed by Jeffrey Lau
Films set in Hong Kong
Films shot in Hong Kong
1995 comedy films
1990s Hong Kong films